Paul McAuliffe (born 8 February 1977) is an Irish Fianna Fáil politician who has been a Teachta Dála (TD) for the Dublin North-West constituency since the 2020 general election. He previously served as Lord Mayor of Dublin from 2019 to 2020.

Early political career
He was a member of the Young Progressive Democrats. McAuliffe contested the 2004 local elections as a Progressive Democrats candidate in Finglas local electoral area, but was not elected. He was first elected as a member of Dublin City Council in 2009, for Fianna Fáil in the Ballymun-Finglas local electoral area. He was re-elected following the 2014 local elections for the enlarged Ballymun local electoral area. Following the 2019 local elections, he was re-elected for Ballymun-Finglas local electoral area.

In 2014, he was elected as leader of the Fianna Fáil group. In 2015, McAuliffe drafted the Moore Street Area Renewal and Development Bill 2015. As chairperson of Enterprise and Economic Development, he jointly delivered the Dublin City Local Economic and Community Plan and the policy Document Dublin A City of Villages. He was chairperson of Dublin City Council's Enterprise and Economic Development Strategic Policy Committee. and the Local Community Development Committee.

In June 2019, he was elected as the 350th Lord Mayor of Dublin, succeeding Nial Ring. McAuliffe was supported by Fianna Fáil, Green Party, Labour Party and the Social Democrats.

Dáil Eireann
McAuliffe was selected to be the Fianna Fáil candidate for Dublin North-West at the 2016 general election. McAuliffe was not elected, being the last candidate to be eliminated on the 9th count. He unsuccessfully contested the 2016 election to Seanad Éireann. At the 2020 general election, McAuliffe was elected on the final count. Briege MacOscar was co-opted to McAuliffe's seat on Dublin City Council following his election to the Dáil.

References

External links
Paul McAuliffe's page on the Fianna Fáil website

Living people
1977 births
Lord Mayors of Dublin
Fianna Fáil TDs
Alumni of the National College of Ireland
Progressive Democrats politicians
Members of the 33rd Dáil